The 2013 Winter Cup was an artistic gymnastics competition held at the Las Vegas Sports Center in Las Vegas from February 7 to February 9, 2013.

Competition
44 current and former collegiate gymnasts, including five members of the 2012 United States men's national gymnastics team, and thirteen members of the U.S. junior national team competed.

Medalists

References

U.S. Winter Cup
Gymnastics
Winter Cup
Winter Cup
Winter Cup